Audubon Park is a neighborhood within the district of South Tampa, which represents District 4 of the Tampa City Council. As of the 2000 census, the neighborhood recorded a population of 19.  The ZIP Code serving the neighborhood is 33609.

Geography
The elevation is 3 feet (1 m) above sea level. Its boundaries are roughly Stoney Point to the west, Palma Ceia West to the east and Sunset Park area to the south.

Education
The community of Audubon Park is served by Hillsborough County Schools.

See also
South Tampa

References

External links
Information from Hometown Locator

Neighborhoods in Tampa, Florida